The Judge James Watson Hamilton House is a historic house in Roseburg, Oregon, United States. The Queen Anne-style residence was designed by William C. Knighton in 1895. It is also known as the Helen Jane Clarke House.

References

External links
Images of the Hamilton House from the University of Oregon Digital Archives

Houses completed in 1895
Houses on the National Register of Historic Places in Oregon
National Register of Historic Places in Douglas County, Oregon
Queen Anne architecture in Oregon
Buildings and structures in Roseburg, Oregon